José Valentim Fialho de Almeida, better known as Fialho de Almeida (7 May 1857 – 4 March 1911), was a Portuguese writer, journalist, and translator associated with Symbolism and the Decadent movement. In his political writings, he often expressed anti-monarchical and republican sentiments.

Works
 Contos (1881)
 A cidade do Vício (1882)
 Os Gatos (1889-1894)
 Lisboa Galante (1890)
 O País das Uvas (1893)
 Galiza (1905)
 Saibam Quantos... (1912) (Non-Fiction)
 Aves Migradoras (1914) 
 A taça do rei de Tule e outros contos (2001, Posthumous)

References

External links
 

19th-century Portuguese people
1857 births
1911 deaths
Symbolism (arts)
Decadent literature